Bad Dürkheim is a district in Rhineland-Palatinate, Germany. It is bounded by (from the west and clockwise) the districts of Kaiserslautern, Donnersbergkreis and Alzey-Worms, the city of Worms, the Rhein-Pfalz-Kreis, the city of Neustadt/Weinstraße, the districts of Südliche Weinstraße, the city of Landau (the Taubensuhl/Fassendeich forest part of the city), the district Südwestpfalz, and the city of Kaiserslautern.

History 

The eastern rim of the Palatinate forest has been densely populated since the Middle Ages. Several medieval castles show the significance of the region during the early Holy Roman Empire.

The district was established in 1969 by combining portions of the former districts of Neustadt and Frankenthal.

Dialect 

The dialect of Bad Dürkheim and environs is closer to the Pennsylvania Dutch language—also known as Pennsylvania German or as Deitsch, the native tongue of the Amish and others—than any other dialect of German.

Geography 

The district is located on the eastern rim of the Palatinate Forest a line of hills called the Haardt. The German Wine Road (Deutsche Weinstraße), a scenic road along the best vineyards of the Palatinate wine region, runs through the district from north to south. The district is sometimes called "the heart of the Palatinate".

The best wine-growing area is the Mittelhaardt ("Middle Haardt"), where the Riesling wine is cultivated, which is considered to be one of the best German wines.

Coat of arms 
The coat of arms displays:
 The heraldic lion of the Palatinate
 Grapes symbolising the Wine Road and the vineyards
 The heraldic eagle of the former county of Leiningen

Towns and municipalities

References

External links 
  (German)

 
Districts of Rhineland-Palatinate
Anterior Palatinate